The Light Blue Line (Din Daeng – Sathon) is a planned monorail line to be built in Bangkok, Thailand. Its path runs along a north–south axis. This line would link the Din Daeng housing community areas, Bangkok City Hall 2, Makkasan Station (for the Suvarnabhumi Airport Rail Link), and the business area along Sathon Road.

The line was tentatively planned to be completed by 2029, but was deferred in 2011 by the government. In 2013, the Bangkok Metropolitan Administration took over responsibility for the Light Blue line project. 

, there is no plan to build this line.

Progress 
The Yingluck Shinawatra-led Pheu Thai government, elected in July 2011, decided not to pursue plans to continue the Grey Line and the Light Blue Line, citing that the lines would not be feasible within their 4-year, 10-lines priority plan. The Bangkok Metropolitan Administration (BMA) was invited to consider both projects but they would have to fund them. 

Given delays in 2013 and 2014 with tendering other priority mass transit lines related to the political crisis in Thailand, it is highly unlikely that the Light Blue line will be considered by either the BMA or the Mass Rapid Transit Authority for many years. , there are no plans to implement the Light Blue line by the BMA.

Stations 
The route has a total of 9 planned stations.

List of planned stations

Network map

See also

 Mass Rapid Transit Master Plan in Bangkok Metropolitan Region
 MRT (Bangkok)
 MRT Blue Line
 MRT Brown Line
 MRT Grey Line
 MRT Pink Line
 MRT Orange Line
 MRT Purple Line
 MRT Yellow Line
 BTS Skytrain
 BTS Sukhumvit Line
 BTS Silom Line
 Airport Rail Link (Bangkok)
 SRT Light Red Line
 SRT Dark Red Line
 Bangkok BRT
 BMA Gold Line

References

External links 
 Airport Rail Link, BTS, MRT & BRT network map
 MRTA

Rapid transit in Bangkok
Proposed public transport in Thailand
Monorails in Thailand